Maranacook Lake is a lake in Kennebec County, Maine located in the towns of Readfield and Winthrop. It is one of the major bodies of water in the Winthrop Lakes Region.

Water supply
Maranacook Lake serves as the secondary drinking water supply for Winthrop, Maine. The area around Maranacook Lake that is not developed is mainly forest and fairly level ground used for agriculture. Maranacook Lake is fed primarily by four perennial streams: Tingley Brook from the northeast, Beaver Brook from the east, Roseanne Brook from the west, and Dead Stream from the northwest. Dead Stream is the main outlet from Torsey Pond to Maranacook Lake's west. Annabessacook Lake is the main outlet, but the lake also feeds Cobbosseecontee Lake and Cobbosseecontee Stream, as well as the Kennebec River.

Recreation
A popular and historic recreation area and tourist attraction, Maranacook is heavily developed with many summer homes, rental cabins, and year-round residences. Known as one of the cleanest bodies of water in Maine, the lake belongs to the Cobbossee Watershed, and is monitored by the Maranacook Lake Association. The North Basin in Readfield is roughly 700 acres and shallow, with a homothermous quality. The roughly 1,000 acre South Basin in Winthrop is deeper and colder. Maranacook Lake Upper Dam is a recent addition to the area. Constructed in 1995, the concrete dam is found at the southeastern tail of the lake in Winthrop. The dam's creation has helped regulate water levels as well as in associated local bodies of water, and it has slowed erosion on the shores of the lake.

Fishing
The lake is known for its populations of smallmouth and largemouth bass, and smelt.

Camp
The lake is home to the popular day camp in Readfield, Camp KV.

References

External links

Survey and Map from State of Maine
Winthrop Lakes Region Chamber of Commerce

Lakes of Kennebec County, Maine
Winthrop, Maine
Reservoirs in Maine